Glucuronoarabinoxylan endo-1,4-beta-xylanase (feraxan endoxylanase, feraxanase, endoarabinoxylanase, glucuronoxylan xylohydrolase, glucuronoxylanase, glucuronoxylan xylanohydrolase, glucuronoarabinoxylan 1,4-beta-D-xylanohydrolase) is an enzyme with systematic name glucuronoarabinoxylan 4-beta-D-xylanohydrolase. This enzyme catalyses the following chemical reaction

 Endohydrolysis of (1->4)-beta-D-xylosyl links in some glucuronoarabinoxylans

This enzyme has high activity towards feruloylated arabinoxylans.

References

External links 
 

EC 3.2.1